Cycas orixensis is an endemic species found in the Indian state of Odisha. The species was recently discovered by Indian scientists, Rita Singh, P. Radha and J.S. Khuraijam

References

External links
 Cycas of India

orixensis